Start Music Aaradhyam Paadum was an Indian Malayalam-language musical game show. It is first premiered in Asianet on 10 August 2019 and also started streaming digitally on Disney+ Hotstar. The show successfully completed four seasons. It is an adaptation of Tamil reality show Start Music.

The first season aired from 10 August 2022 to 4 January 2022 with 43 episodes. The second season aired from 14 November 2020 to 7 February 2021 with 24 episodes. The third season aired from 27 August to 26 December with 39 episode with tv serial Santhwanam  emerging as the winner. The fourth season aired from 25 June to 26 november with 37 episodes.

Overview
Start Music Aaradhyam Paadum is a reality show based on Musical, every week, 8 celebrities, faced questions and tasks about the Music and win exciting prizes. They would be divided into two teams, consisting of four members in each one. There are four interesting music-related rounds of games in this show, namely, Iswaryathinte siran, Engile Ennodupara, Ippo sheriyakkitharam and Lelu Allu Lelu Allu Lelu Allu.

Season(s)

List of episodes

Season 1

Season 2

Season 3

References

2019 Indian television series debuts
2020 Indian television series endings
2020 Indian television series debuts
2021 Indian television series endings
2021 Indian television series debuts
Indian reality television series
Indian television series
Indian game shows
Asianet (TV channel) original programming
Malayalam-language television shows